Thomas Harley may refer to:
 Thomas Harley (ice hockey)
 Thomas Harley (politician, born 1730)
 Thomas Harley (of Kinsham)
 Tom Harley, a former professional Australian rules footballer
 Tom Hartley, bass singer with The Swingles